Lin Ya-hua (born 30 December 1975) is a Taiwanese archer. She competed in the women's individual and team events at the 1996 Summer Olympics.

References

1975 births
Living people
Taiwanese female archers
Olympic archers of Taiwan
Archers at the 1996 Summer Olympics
Place of birth missing (living people)